Lim Ho Puah was a Hokkien merchant who was born in Amoy in 30 December 1841 and came to Singapore at an early age. He was employed by Wee Bin & Co., where his abilities were noticed by his employer, Wee Bin. He later married Wee Bin's daughter. He was the founder and senior partner of the Wee Bin Steamship Line and other concerns.

Lim became the sole surviving partner in the firm of Wee Bin & Co. when Wee Bin's grandson Wee Siang Tat died. The company was liquidated in 1911, when the greater part of the firm's business, including all the large steamships, was taken over by his son Lim Peng Siang.

Lim was a Director of Tan Kim Ching's Tanjong Pagar Dock Company, served as a member of the Chinese Advisory Board and on the Committee of the Po Leung Kuk, and was made a Justice of the Peace. He died on 11 February 1914 at the age of 74. His remains were interred in China.

References

Further reading
 
 

1841 births
1914 deaths
Hokkien people
Singaporean people of Hokkien descent
Businesspeople from Fujian
People from Xiamen
Singaporean business executives